Botany Bay is a bay in Broadstairs facing the north sea, Kent, England.

Botany Bay is the northernmost of seven bays in Broadstairs. It features chalk cliffs and a sea stack and is a popular tourist location. Bathing is reportedly safe for swimming, surfing, and kayaking, and lifeguards are on duty.

Filming
Botany Bay is a popular film location, having been used by productions such as BBC's D- Day: The Last Heroes, Tamil action drama Thaandavam, Sky Atlantic comedy Hunderby, BBC drama True Love as well as music videos for Bat For Lashes, Bebe Black, Shawn Mendes' song "There's Nothing Holdin' Me Back", and commercials for Land Rover, Sainsburys and Natwest and photoshoots for many fashion editorials.  "Dress Code" an episode from the web series, The Mute Series, was also shot there.

Other bays in the area are Kingsgate Bay, Joss Bay, Stone Bay, Viking Bay, Louisa Bay and Dumpton Bay.

References

Bays of Kent
Broadstairs
Beaches of Kent